Wollong Station is a railway station of the Gyeongui–Jungang Line in Wollong-myeon, Paju, Gyeonggi-do, South Korea. Its station subname is Seoyoung Univ., where said university is nearby.

Station Layout

External links
 Station information from Korail

Seoul Metropolitan Subway stations
Railway stations opened in 1998
Metro stations in Paju